Euxoa servitus, the slave dart, is a species of cutworm or dart moth in the family Noctuidae.

The MONA or Hodges number for Euxoa servitus is 10854.

References

Further reading

 
 
 

Euxoa
Articles created by Qbugbot
Moths described in 1895